Talha Anjum Rasheed (born 3 October 1996) is a Pakistani rapper, songwriter and lyricist. He was born and raised in Karachi and is popularly known for being a member and co-founder of the Hip-hop band, Young Stunners along with Talhah Yunus, with Jokhay as music producer. His first original was "Burger-e-Karachi" which was released in 2013 and it rose to fame. Some of his major hits include Tum Tum, "Gumaan", "Don't Mind" and "Groove Mera" as the anthem of PSL 6.

Life

Talha was born in the largest city of Pakistan, Karachi on 3rd October, 1996. He got his primary education at the Army Public School of Karachi. He has two siblings.

Career

Earlier Anjum used to do rap battles in his school times. Anjum used fundamental issues and references to gain audience applicability. Talhah Yunus and Anjum realizied their potential, and they formed the duo band which is today known as The 'Young Stunners', based in Karachi. Their music is produced by Jokhay. "Burger-e-Karachi" was their first release, it rose them to fame. Their major hits are: the collaborative 2021 PSL anthem Groove Mera, performance at the 2021 Pakistan Day Parade and music video song named "Afsanay".

They both are the one who are the founding fathers of Urdu rap into the Pakistani music industry.

Discography 

This Section of Talha Anjum contains singles released , or tracks he is featured on. For singles released by Young Stunners (with Talha Yunus), see Young Stunners' discography.

Albums

Singles and collaborations

Live performances

References 

1996 births
Pakistani rappers
Living people